Iván Serrano García (born 7 January 2001) is a Spanish footballer who plays as a left back for Linares Deportivo, on loan from Burgos CF.

Club career
Serrano was born in Avilés, Asturias, and played for local sides CD Los Campos, CD Bosco and CD Quirinal before joining Real Oviedo in 2015. On 24 August 2019, aged 18, he moved to Real Betis.

In 2020, Serrano joined Burgos CF and was assigned to the reserves in the Tercera División. He made his senior debut on 1 November, starting in a 0–2 away loss against Real Ávila CF.

Serrano made his first team debut on 2 May 2021, starting in a 0–1 loss at Unionistas de Salamanca CF in the Segunda División B. At the end of the campaign, both first and B-teams achieved promotion to the Segunda División and Segunda División RFEF respectively.

Serrano made his professional debut on 14 December 2021, starting in a 0–2 away loss against Real Zaragoza in the season's Copa del Rey. The following 23 August, he moved to Primera Federación side Linares Deportivo on a one-year loan deal.

References

External links

2001 births
Living people
People from Avilés
Spanish footballers
Footballers from Asturias
Association football defenders
Segunda División B players
Segunda Federación players
Tercera División players
Burgos CF Promesas players
Burgos CF footballers
Linares Deportivo footballers